Xu Liangcai (born August 1968) is a Chinese military officer currently serving as commander of the People's Liberation Army in Macao.

Biography
Xu was born in August 1968 in Tongshan County, Hubei. He enlisted in the army in September 1986 and joined the Communist Party of China in June 1989. 

He served in various posts in the Southern Theater Command, including director of Joint Operation Department.

On January 1, 2019, Xi Jinping, chairman of the Central Military Commission, appointed him as commander of the People's Liberation Army in Macau, replacing Liao Zhengrong.

References

External links

1968 births
People from Xianning
Living people
People's Liberation Army generals
People's Liberation Army generals from Hubei